Roane is a surname. Notable people with the surname include:

Anthony Roane (died 1583), English politician
Archibald Roane (1769–1819), 2nd Governor of Tennessee 
John Roane (1766–1838), American politician
John Roane (1794–1869), American politician
John Roane (1817–1867), 4th Governor of Arkansas
Spencer Roane (1762–1822), American jurist
William Roane (1787–1845), American politician

See also
Roane County (disambiguation)
Justice Roane (disambiguation)